Chan Chor Khine (born in Rangoon, Burma) was a Burmese-Chinese businessman, land-owner, investor and philanthropist.

Early life 
Chan was born in 1886 to self-made millionaire father Chan Mah Phee and his mother, the daughter of a Burmese peasant. He attended St Paul's High School, Rangoon before being educated further in China.

Rangoon
Chan returned to Burma to join his father's business Taik Leong. The company dealt primarily in oil, rice and tobacco exports. Chan ultimately became manager of the company upon his father's retirement. He served as an honorary magistrate on the board of the Corporation of Rangoon.

Chan donated 10 acres of land for the construction of the Chinese High School in Rangoon.

Death
Chan committed suicide in April 1934 at 10:20am by shooting himself in the head at his estate, the Brightlands.

References

20th-century Burmese businesspeople
Burmese people of Chinese descent
1886 births
1934 deaths
Suicides by firearm